Cassius Dio (291–297) was a Roman senator who was appointed consul in AD 291.

Biography
Cassius Dio was either the grandson or great-grandson of his namesake, the historian Cassius Dio, whose family originated in Bithynia. He was appointed consul posterior in 291 alongside Gaius Junius Tiberianus at quite a young age. This was followed by a posting as Proconsular governor of Africa from approximately 1 July 294 to 1 July 295. Then on 18 February 296, he was appointed Praefectus urbi of Rome, a position he held until 297.

Cassius Dio owned a house on the Palatine Hill called the Domus Dionis. At some stage, he and 12 other senators each contributed 400,000 sesterces, probably for the construction of a building.

References

Sources
 Christol, Michel, Essai sur l'évolution des carrières sénatoriales dans la seconde moitié du IIIe siècle ap. J.C. (1986)
 Martindale, J. R.; Jones, A. H. M, The Prosopography of the Later Roman Empire, Vol. I AD 260–395, Cambridge University Press (1971)

3rd-century Romans
Dio
Imperial Roman consuls
Roman governors of Africa
Urban prefects of Rome
Year of birth unknown
Year of death unknown